CBCP may refer to one of the following:
Center Beam Candle Power 
Certified Building Commissioning Professional, an Association of Energy Engineers certification
Cross-Border Co-operation Process, a European union initiative 
Catholic Bishops' Conference of the Philippines
Certified Business Continuity Professional
Chicago Bulls College Prep, a high school in Chicago
 City Boundary Coordination Project, a large scale project in City Boundaries of Iran